Crayfish are freshwater crustaceans belonging to the clade Astacidea, which also contains lobsters. In some locations, they are also known as baybugs, crabfish, crawfish,  crawdaddies, crawdads, freshwater lobsters,  mountain lobsters, mudbugs, rock lobsters,  signal crawfish,  or yabbies. Taxonomically, they are members of the superfamilies Astacoidea and Parastacoidea. They breathe through feather-like gills. Some species are found in brooks and streams, where  fresh water is running, while others thrive in swamps, ditches, and paddy fields. Most crayfish cannot tolerate polluted water, although some species, such as Procambarus clarkii, are hardier. Crayfish feed on animals and plants, either living or decomposing, and detritus.

The term "crayfish" is applied to saltwater species in some countries.

Terminology 

The name "crayfish" comes from the Old French word  (Modern French ). The word has been modified to "crayfish" by association with "fish" (folk etymology). The largely American variant "crawfish" is similarly derived.

Some kinds of crayfish are known locally as lobsters, crawdads, mudbugs, and yabbies. In the Eastern United States, "crayfish" is more common in the north, while "crawdad" is heard more in central and southwestern regions, and "crawfish" farther south, although considerable overlaps exist.

The study of crayfish is called astacology.

Anatomy 

The body of a decapod crustacean, such as a crab, lobster, or prawn (shrimp), is made up of twenty body segments grouped into two main body parts, the cephalothorax and the abdomen. Each segment may possess one pair of appendages, although in various groups, these may be reduced or missing. Walking legs have a small claw at the end.

Classification and geographical distribution 

Crayfish are closely related to lobsters, and together they belong to the infraorder Astacidea. Their phylogeny can be shown in the simplified cladogram below:

Four extant (living) families of crayfish are described, three in the Northern Hemisphere and one in the Southern Hemisphere. The Southern Hemisphere (Gondwana-distributed) family Parastacidae, with 14 extant genera and two extinct genera, live(d) in South America, Madagascar, and Australasia. They are distinguished by the absence of the first pair of pleopods. Of the other three Northern Hemisphere families (grouped in the superfamily Astacoidea), the four genera of the family Astacidae live in western Eurasia and western North America, the 15 genera of the family Cambaridae live in eastern North America, and the single genus of Cambaroididae live in eastern Asia.

North America  

The greatest diversity of crayfish species is found in southeastern North America, with over 330 species in 15 genera, all in the family Cambaridae. A further genus of astacid crayfish is found in the Pacific Northwest and the headwaters of some rivers east of the Continental Divide. Many crayfish are also found in lowland areas where the water is abundant in calcium, and oxygen rises from underground springs.

In 1983, Louisiana designated the crayfish, or crawfish as they are commonly called, as its official state crustacean. Louisiana produces  of crawfish per year with the red swamp and white river crawfish being the main species harvested. Crawfish are a part of Cajun culture dating back hundreds of years. A variety of cottage industries have developed as a result of commercialized crawfish iconography. Their products include crawfish attached to wooden plaques, T-shirts with crawfish logos, and crawfish pendants, earrings, and necklaces made of gold or silver.

Australia 

Australia has over 100 species in a dozen genera. It is home to the world's three largest freshwater crayfish:
 the Murray crayfish Euastacus armatus, which can reach , although  reports of animals up to  have been made. It is found in much of the southern Murray-Darling basin.
 the marron from Western Australia (now believed to be two species, Cherax tenuimanus and C. cainii) which may reach 

Many of the better-known Australian crayfish are of the genus Cherax, and include the common yabby (C. destructor), western yabby (C. preissii), and red-claw crayfish (C. quadricarinatus).

The marron species C. tenuimanus is critically endangered, while other large Australasian crayfish are threatened or endangered.

New Zealand 

In New Zealand, two species of Paranephrops are endemic, and are known by the Māori name .

Other animals  

Exceptions include western rock lobster (of the Palinuridae family) found on the west coast of Australia (it is a spiny lobster, but not of Jasus); the Tasmanian giant freshwater crayfish (from the Parastacidae family and therefore a true crayfish) found only in Tasmania; and the Murray crayfish found along Australia's Murray River.

In Singapore, the term crayfish typically refers to Thenus orientalis, a seawater crustacean from the slipper lobster family. True crayfish are not native to Singapore, but are commonly found as pets, or as an invasive species (Cherax quadricarinatus) in the many water catchment areas, and are alternatively known as freshwater lobsters.

In England and Ireland, the terms crayfish or crawfish commonly refer to the European spiny lobster, a saltwater species found in much of the East Atlantic and Mediterranean. The only true crayfish species native to the British Isles is the endangered white clawed crayfish.

Fossil record 

Fossil records of crayfish older than 30 million years are rare, but fossilised burrows have been found from strata as old as the late Palaeozoic or early Mesozoic. The oldest records of the Parastacidae are in Australia, and are 115 million years old and the crayfish Palaeocambarus and Cricoidoscelosus from the Yixian Formation of China are likely around 120 million years old, making them both one of, if not, the oldest known crayfish to date.

Threats to crayfish 

Crayfish are susceptible to infections such as crayfish plague and to environmental stressors including acidification. In Europe, they are particularly threatened by crayfish plague, which is caused by the North American water mold Aphanomyces astaci. This water mold was transmitted to Europe when North American species of crayfish were introduced. Species of the genus Astacus are particularly susceptible to infection, allowing the plague-coevolved signal crayfish (native to western North America) to invade parts of Europe.

Acid rain can cause problems for crayfish across the world. In whole-ecosystem experiments simulating acid rain at the Experimental Lakes Area in Ontario, Canada, crayfish populations crashed – probably because their exoskeletons are weaker in acidified environments.

Invasive pest 

In several countries, particularly in Europe, native species of crayfish are under threat by imported species, particularly the signal crayfish (Pacifastacus leniusculus).  Crayfish are also considered an invasive predatory species, endangering native European species such as the Italian agile frog.

Uses

Culinary use 

Crayfish are eaten worldwide. Like other edible crustaceans, only a small portion of the body of a crayfish is eaten. In most prepared dishes, such as soups, bisques and étouffées, only the tail portion is served. At crawfish boils or other meals where the entire body of the crayfish is presented, other portions, such as the claw meat, may be eaten.

Global crayfish production is centered in Asia, primarily China. In 2018, Asian production accounted for 95% of the world's crawfish supply. 

Crayfish is part of Swedish cuisine and is usually eaten in August at special crayfish parties (Swedish Kräftskiva). Documentation of the consumption of crayfish dates to at least the 16th century. On the Swedish west coast, Nephrops norvegicus (Swedish Havskräfta, sea crayfish) is more commonly eaten while various freshwater crayfish are consumed in the rest of the country. Prior to the 1960s, crayfish was largely inaccessible to the urban population in Sweden and consumption was largely limited to the upper classes or farmers holding fishing rights in fresh water lakes. With the introduction of import of frozen crayfish the crayfish party is now practiced widely practiced across all spheres in Sweden and among the Swedish-speaking population of Finland.

In the United States, crayfish production is strongly centered in Louisiana, with 93% of crayfish farms located in the state as of 2018. In 1987, Louisiana produced 90% of the crayfish harvested in the world, 70% of which were consumed locally. In 2007, the Louisiana crayfish harvest was about 54,800 tons, almost all of it from aquaculture. About 70–80% of crayfish produced in Louisiana are Procambarus clarkii (red swamp crawfish), with the remaining 20–30% being Procambarus zonangulus (white river crawfish). Optimum dietary nutritional requirement of freshwater crayfish, or crayfish nutrient specifications are now available for aquaculture feed producers 

Like all crustaceans, crayfish are not kosher because they are aquatic animals that do not have both fins and scales. They are therefore not eaten by observant Jews.

Bait 

Crayfish are preyed upon by a variety of ray-finned fishes, and are commonly used as bait, either live or with only the tail meat. They are a popular bait for catching catfish, largemouth bass, smallmouth bass, striped bass, perch, pike and muskie. When using live crayfish as bait, anglers prefer to hook them between the eyes, piercing through their hard, pointed beak which causes them no harm; therefore, they remain more active.

When using crayfish as bait, it is important to fish in the same environment where they were caught. An Illinois State University report that focused on studies conducted on the Fox River and Des Plaines River watershed stated that rusty crayfish, initially caught as bait in a different environment, were dumped into the water and "outcompeted the native clearwater crayfish". Other studies confirmed that transporting crayfish to different environments has led to various ecological problems, including the elimination of native species. Transporting crayfish as live bait has also contributed to the spread of zebra mussels in various waterways throughout Europe and North America, as they are known to attach themselves to exoskeleton of crayfishes.

Pets 

Crayfish are kept as pets in freshwater aquariums. They prefer foods like shrimp pellets or various vegetables, but will also eat tropical fish food, regular fish food, algae wafers, and small fish that can be captured with their claws. A report by the National Park Service as well as video and anecdotal reports by aquarium owners indicate that crayfish will eat their moulted exoskeleton "to recover the calcium and phosphates contained in it."  As omnivores, crayfish will eat almost anything; therefore, they may explore the edibility of aquarium plants in a fish tank. However, most species of dwarf crayfish, such as Cambarellus patzcuarensis, will not destructively dig or eat live aquarium plants.

In some nations, such as the United Kingdom, United States, Australia, and New Zealand, imported alien crayfish are a danger to local rivers. The three most widespread American species invasive in Europe are Faxonius limosus, Pacifastacus leniusculus and Procambarus clarkii. Crayfish may spread into different bodies of water because specimens captured for pets in one river are often released into a different catchment. There is a potential for ecological damage when crayfish are introduced into non-native bodies of water: e.g., crayfish plague in Europe, or the introduction of the common yabby (Cherax destructor) into drainages east of the Great Dividing Range in Australia.

Sentinel species 

The Protivin brewery in the Czech Republic uses crayfish outfitted with sensors to detect any changes in their bodies or pulse activity in order to monitor the purity of the water used in their product. The creatures are kept in a fish tank that is fed with the same local natural source water used in their brewing. If three or more of the crayfish have changes to their pulses, employees know there is a change in the water and examine the parameters.

Scientists also monitor crayfish in the wild in natural bodies of water to study the levels of pollutants there.

See also 

 Arthropods in culture
 Pain in crustaceans

References

Further reading 

 
 
 
 Regional European Crayfish Workshop: Future of Native Crayfish in Europe. Knowledge and Management of Aquatic Ecosystems. No. 394–395 (2009).

External links 

 International Association of Astacology (IAA)
 America's Crayfish: Crawling In Troubled Waters
 Louisiana Crawfish Research and Promotion Board
 
 https://ontarionature.org/wp-content/uploads/2017/10/crayfish_apr08.pdf

 
Freshwater crustaceans
Mesozoic first appearances
Articles containing video clips
Arthropod common names